The FIL World Luge Championships 1961 took place in Girenbad, Switzerland.

Men's singles

Women's singles

Men's doubles

Medal table

References

Men's doubles World Champions
Men's singles World Champions
Women's singles World Champions

FIL World Luge Championships
1961 in luge
1961 in Swiss sport
Luge in Switzerland